Roy Lee Sanders (June 10, 1894 – July 8, 1963) was a Major League Baseball pitcher. In 14 career games, he had a 1–3 record, with a 4.60 ERA. He batted and threw right-handed.

Sanders was born in Pittsburg, Kansas, and died in Louisville, Kentucky.

External links

1894 births
1963 deaths
Major League Baseball pitchers
New York Yankees players
St. Louis Browns players
Baseball players from Kansas
People from Pittsburg, Kansas
Omaha Rourkes players
Topeka Jayhawks players
Fort Dodge Dodgers players
Joplin Miners players
Toledo Iron Men players
Louisville Colonels (minor league) players
Columbus Senators players
Milwaukee Brewers (minor league) players
Nashville Vols players